Adenanthos linearis is a shrub of the family Proteaceae, native to the south coast of Western Australia. Within the genus Adenanthos, it lies in the section Adenanthos and has had only 14 known occurrences; only five of which have exact coordinates.

References

External links
 
 
 

linearis
Eudicots of Western Australia